Anahi Eduarda Ortiz Verdezoto (born 2001), is an Ecuadorian chess player. She was awarded the title of Woman International Master in 2019.

Chess career
She qualified for the Women's Chess World Cup 2021, where she was defeated 2-0 by Ekaterina Atalik in the first round.

References

External links
 
 
 Anahi Ortiz Verdezoto chess games at 365Chess.com

2001 births
Living people
Ecuadorian chess players
Chess Olympiad competitors
21st-century Ecuadorian women